The Ministry of Presidency, Civil Service and Justice is a department of the Galician regional government.

The Consellería's principal role is the management of the relationship between the Xunta and the local authorities, as well as the legal system.

Departmental roles
 Conselleiro: José Luis Méndez Romeu
 General Secretary: Santigo Antonio Gómez Roura
 Dirección General de Administración Local: Matilde Begoña Rodríguez Rumbo
 Dirección General de Calidad y Evaluacióin de las Políticas Públicas: Juan José Gómez Romero
 Dirección General de la Función Púbica: José Rodríguez González
 Dirección General de Interior: María Isabel Durántez Gil
 Dirección General de Protección Civil: Esther González Saavedra
 Dirección General de Relaciones Parlamentarias: Manuel Guillermo Varela Flores
 Dirección General de Justicia: Julio Ignacio Iglesias Redondo

Executive agencies
Escola Galega de Administración Pública (EGAP)
Centro de Seguridade Pública de Galicia
Policía Autonómica de Galicia
Instituto de Medicina Legal de Galicia (IMELGA)

Former conselleiros
 Xosé Luís Barreiro Rivas (1982–1983).
 Manuel Anxo Villanueva Cendón (1986–1987)
 Pablo González Mariñas (1987–1989)
 Dositeo Rodríguez (1989–1999)
 Xaime Pita (1999–2005)
 José Luis Méndez Romeu (2005–2009)
 Alfonso Rueda (2009-)

External links
 Consellería de Presidencia, Administracións Públicas e Xustiza 
 Escola Galega de Administración Pública 

Galicia
Galicia